The Hope Chest is an American silent comedy-drama film released in 1918, starring Dorothy Gish. The film was directed by Elmer Clifton and based on a serialized story (and later novel) by Mark Lee Luther, originally published in Woman's Home Companion. It is not known whether the film currently survives.

Plot
Sheila Moore (Gish) takes a job at a candy store to support her father, an out-of-work vaudevillian. She attracts the romantic attentions of the store owner's son Tom (Barthalmess) and marries him, incurring the wrath of Tom's parents.

Cast

Production
The Hope Chest was shot in Los Angeles, with production wrapping in late-September, 1918.

Release
The first screenings of The Hope Chest in New Zealand appear to have been in Wellington, where it played simultaneously in two theaters in August, 1919. The film played at the Strand Theatre in Christchurch in early September, 1919.

References

External links

 
 
 The Hope Chest at the Silent Film Still Archive

1918 films
American romantic comedy-drama films
American silent feature films
American black-and-white films
Films directed by Elmer Clifton
1910s romantic comedy-drama films
1919 comedy films
1919 films
1918 comedy films
1918 drama films
1919 drama films
1910s American films
1910s English-language films
Silent romantic comedy-drama films
Silent American comedy-drama films